Dimitar Dimitrov may refer to:

 Dimitar Dimitrov (bobsleigh) (born 1966), Bulgarian Olympic bobsledder
 Dimitar Dimitrov (football manager) (born 1959), Bulgarian football manager
 Dimitar Dimitrov (writer) (born 1937), former Macedonian Minister of Culture
 Dimitar Dimitrov (volleyball) (born 1952), Bulgarian former volleyball player
 Dimitar Dimitrov (footballer, born 1949), Bulgarian footballer
 Dimitar Dimitrov (footballer, born 1989), Bulgarian footballer
 Dimitar Dimitrov (footballer, born 1990), Bulgarian footballer
 Dimitar Dimitrov (gymnast) (born 1978), Bulgarian artistic gymnast
 Dimitar Dimitrov (basketball), Bulgarian basketball player
 Dimitar Dimitrov (zoologist), zoologist interested in spiders
 Dimitar Dimitrov (curler), Bulgarian curler and curling coach